Spring Valley High School may refer to:

 Springs Valley High School, French Lick, Indiana
 Spring Valley High School (Nevada), Spring Valley, Nevada
 Spring Valley High School (New York), Spring Valley, New York
 Spring Valley High School (South Carolina), Columbia, South Carolina
 Spring Valley High School (West Virginia), Huntington, West Virginia
 Spring Valley High School (Wisconsin), Spring Valley, Wisconsin